Big Fossil Creek is a stream in Tarrant County, in the U.S. state of Texas.

Big Fossil Creek was so named on account of the fossils found there by an early settler. The area of North Ft. Worth near Big Fossil Creek is occupied indigenous land where Tawakoni, Wichita, Kiikaapoi, Jumanos, and Nʉmʉnʉʉ would overlap/intersect.

See also
List of rivers of Texas

References

Rivers of Tarrant County, Texas
Rivers of Texas